Wilks Creek Bridge is a former timber and bluestone road bridge on the Yarra Track, located just off the Black Spur route, between Narbethong and , Victoria, Australia.

It was built in 1870 to the design of colonial Public Works Department engineer Clement Wilks as part of the construction of a new road to the Woods Point and Jordan Goldfields. Like many bridges of the period, it had a timber superstructure employing squared beams supported by struts and straining pieces, on cut bluestone abutments.

The bridge was remodelled around 1900 by engineer John Monash of the famous bridge-engineering firm of Monash and Anderson.

It was last used for heavy vehicular traffic in 1980 following the realignment of Marysville Road, and was left to decay until its demolishment in 2008. All timber traces of the bridge were destroyed in the 2009 Black Saturday fires. The handcrafted bluestone masonry wingwalls and abutments, especially shaped to receive timber struts, rate among the earliest of its kind surviving intact in Victoria.

See also
 The Big Culvert

References

External links
 Obituary: Clement Wilks, 1819-1871  Minutes of the Proceedings of the Institution of Civil Engineers, Vol.33 January 1872 pp. 275–276 - Thomas Telford-ICE Virtual Library 

Beam bridges
Bridges completed in 1871
Road bridges in Victoria (Australia)
1871 establishments in Australia
2008 disestablishments in Australia
Former bridges in Australia
Wooden bridges in Australia
Stone bridges in Australia